Robert Michaels (Roberto Michele Buttarazzi) (born in Toronto, Canada) is a Juno Award winner and nominee, multi-gold and platinum-selling recording artist, guitarist and vocalist.

Michaels returned from Canada to his mothers home town of Arpino, Italy when he was just a few years old. Living roughly 95 km southeast of Rome in Italy, he was exposed to Italian music, art, and culture from an early age. Much of that time was spent at his grandfathers restaurant, before moving back with his family to Toronto.

His debut CD, titled Paradiso, was released in 1996 and was nominated for a Juno Award (Canadian Grammy). Paradiso album reached Platinum status eventually sold more than 100,000 copies in Canada.

In 1998, Michaels was nominated for Instrumental Artist(s) of the Year for a JUNO Award. His album Utopia was nominated in 2000 for a JUNO Award for Best Instrumental Album, and his next album Allegro has already won JUNO Award for Instrumental Album of the Year.

His album Via Italia was released in 2013.

One of Michaels' songs, "Wrong to Let You Go",  was a co-write collaboration with the band the Wild Strawberries that reached top 10 on the Canadian Adult Contemporary charts. It was recorded for volume 3 of the Women & Songs compilation album series created and produced by Alan Fletcher. Subsequently, Alan Fletcher from Warner put the band in contact with German electronic dance producer and DJ André Tanneberger (ATB). Tanneberger produced a remix of the song, released as an ATB single re-titled "Let U Go". This popularized the song on both continents, as the single reached number 18 on the U.S. Billboard Hot Dance Music/Club Play charts[4] and number 7 on the German Singles Chart.[5] The song also marked the point in ATB's musical output when he began to produce songs with full vocal tracks, as opposed to sampled and looped vocals.[6]

Awards and nominations 

Juno Awards
The Juno Awards is a Canadian awards ceremony presented annually by the Canadian Academy of Recording Arts and Sciences. Robert Michaels won the 2003 Juno for Instrumental Album of the Year and received an additional 3 nominations.

|-
|  || Robert Michaels || Instrumental Artist(s) of the Year || 
|-
|  || Utopia || Best Instrumental Album || 
|-
|  ||Allegro || Instrumental Album of the Year || 
|-

Juno Awards Artist Summary Robert Michaels

Music Canada Gold and Platinum Certification Awards Certifications

Certified albums 

Paradiso (1996) Certified: Gold and Platinum

Music Canada Gold/Platinum Artist Summary Robert Michaels

Discography

Other Compilation Appearances 
Guitar Music For Small Rooms (1997) (WEA)
Guitar Music For Small Rooms 2 (2001) (WEA)
Guitar Music For Small Rooms 3 (2004) (WEA)

See also 
New Flamenco
Flamenco rumba

References

External links 
 Robert Michaels | Official Website
 

Canadian guitarists
Living people
Year of birth missing (living people)
Flamenco guitarists
Musicians from Toronto
Juno Award for Instrumental Album of the Year winners
Canadian world music musicians